Francesco Giustiniano di Garibaldo was a statesman who became doge of the Republic of Genoa. He was elected doge on 16 July 1393 after his predecessor was forced to step down after only one day in office. He himself remained in office only two weeks until the exiled Montaldo family returned and Antoniotto di Montaldo was elected as the new doge.

References

14th-century Doges of Genoa